Franklin Davis may refer to:

 Franklin A. Davis (born 1939), American chemist
 Franklin M. Davis Jr. (1918–1980), major general in the United States Army

See also
Frank Davis (disambiguation)
Franklin Davies (disambiguation)